Desmiphora ferruginea is a species of beetle in the family Cerambycidae. It was described by Thomson in 1868. It is known from Brazil, Ecuador, and French Guiana.

References

Desmiphora
Beetles described in 1868